is a Japanese supermarket chain operated by . The company was acquired by H2O Retailing in 2014, making it a wholly owned subsidiary, to raise its profile in the Kansai region.

It operates the Qanat department stores as well as separate Izumiya grocery stores mainly in Kansai region.  It also issues the Izumiya Club Cards, the Izumiya credit cards (VISA/MasterCard/JCB) and the Izumiya ETC cards.

The first Izumiya department store vested abroad is in Suzhou, Jiangsu province, China.

References

External links

 

Supermarkets of Japan
Companies based in Osaka Prefecture
Japanese supermarkets